David Faristian (born December 15, 1989 in Gresik, East Java) is an Indonesian footballer who currently plays as a midfielder for PSG Gresik in the Liga 2.

References

External links

1989 births
Living people
People from Gresik Regency
Association football midfielders
Indonesian footballers
Liga 1 (Indonesia) players
Gresik United players
Indonesian Premier Division players
PS Barito Putera players
Persipur Purwodadi players
Sportspeople from East Java